Undisputed is the eighteenth studio album by dancehall DJ Beenie Man, released on August 29, 2006.

Track listing
Credits adapted from the album's liner notes.

Charts

References

2006 albums
Beenie Man albums
Albums produced by Scott Storch